Daniela Urzi (born  October 28, 1975, San Fernando, Buenos Aires) is an Argentinian model. She has appeared in fashion campaigns for Armani Jeans, the Giorgio Armani collection, Roberto Cavalli, Burberry, and John Richmond, and has done catalog work for Victoria's Secret.  Her magazine covers include international editions of Vogue and ELLE.

References

External links

Daniela Urzi (official site)

1975 births
Living people
Argentine female models
21st-century Argentine women